The Girl from Amalfi (Italian:La fanciulla d'Amalfi) is a 1921 Italian silent film directed by Roberto Roberti and starring Francesca Bertini and Lydia De Roberti.

Cast 
 Francesca Bertini
 Lydia De Roberti 
 Jeanne Nolly 
 Roberto Roberti

References

Bibliography
 Bianchi, Pietro. Francesca Bertini e le dive del cinema muto. Unione tipografico-editrice torinese, 1969.

External links

 The film is listed twice

1921 films
1920s Italian-language films
Films directed by Roberto Roberti
Italian silent short films
Italian black-and-white films